Lewis Benedictus Smedes (August 20, 1921 – December 19, 2002) was a renowned Christian author, ethicist, and theologian in the Reformed tradition. He was a professor of theology and ethics for twenty-five years at Fuller Theological Seminary in Pasadena, California.  His 15 books, including the popular Forgive and Forget: Healing the Hurts We Don't Deserve, covered some important issues including sexuality and forgiveness.

Personal
Lewis Benedictus Smedes was born in 1921, the youngest of five children. His father, Melle Smedes, and mother, Rena, emigrated to the United States from Oostermeer, Friesland in the Netherlands (Rena's original name was Renske.) When he was two months old, his father died in the partially completed house he built in Muskegon, Michigan.

Smedes married Doris Dekker. He died after falling from a ladder at his home in Sierra Madre, California on December 19, 2002. He was survived by his wife, three children, two grandchildren and one brother.

Education
Smedes graduated from Calvin College (B.A.), Calvin Theological Seminary (B.D.), and the Free University of Amsterdam (Th.D).  He pursued other graduate studies at Oxford University in United Kingdom and the University of Basel in Switzerland.

Professional
Smedes began his teaching career at Fuller Theological Seminary as a visiting professor in 1968.  He joined the faculty as full professor in 1970.  He retired in 1995.

After his time at Fuller, Smedes performed several years of pastoral service in the Christian Reformed Church at Madison Avenue Christian Reformed Church (Paterson, NJ), where he was ordained.

Smedes also taught at the Free University in Amsterdam (1968 to 1969) and Calvin College (1957 to 1970) in Grand Rapids, Michigan.

Collections of Smedes papers are housed at Calvin University and Fuller Theological Seminary.

Major works
In addition to many articles, Smedes wrote many popular books including:

 Forgive & Forget: Healing the Hurts We Don't Deserve, Harper, 1984
 A Pretty Good Person What it Takes to Live with Courage, Gratitude, & Integrity or When Pretty Good Is as Good as You Can Be, Harper, 1990
 Standing on the Promises
 Choices:  Making Right Decisions in a Complex World
 How Can It Be All Right When Everything Is All Wrong?
 Caring & Commitment:  Learning to Live the Love We Promise
 The Incarnation in Modern Anglo-Catholic Theology
 All Things Made New
 Love Within Limits
 Sex for Christians
 Mere Morality: What God Expects From Ordinary People
 A Life of Distinction
 The Art of Forgiving
 Shame and Grace: Healing the Shame We Don't Deserve
 Keeping Hope Alive
 My God and I, a Spiritual Memoir, Eerdmans, 2003

References
 Mark A. Kellner (December 1, 2002) Lewis Smedes Dead at 81 from Christianity Today
 Lewis Smedes Papers .

1921 births
2002 deaths
American people of Dutch descent
Calvin University alumni
Christian Reformed Church ministers
People from Muskegon, Michigan
Fuller Theological Seminary faculty
Vrije Universiteit Amsterdam alumni
University of Basel alumni
Alumni of the University of Oxford
People from Sierra Madre, California
20th-century American clergy